Robert Edward Tickner  (born 24 December 1951) is a former Australian Labor Party cabinet minister.  He was Chief Executive Officer of the Australian Red Cross from February 2005 to July 2015.

Born in Sydney, Tickner was adopted. He later searched for his birth mother after the birth of his own son. He was educated at the University of Sydney.  Prior to entering parliament, he worked as a university lecturer at the NSW Institute of Technology from 1974 to 1979, then as principal solicitor for the NSW Aboriginal Legal Service from 1979 to 1984.

Tickner was one of the early and influential members of Friends of the Earth Australia in Sydney in 1975, being the lease owner of a three-storey terrace on Crown St, Surry Hills which became the FoE Sydney bookshop and office. He was convenor of the FoE urban campaign which opposed the Sydney City Council's inappropriate high rise development.

From 1977 to 1984 he was elected as a Labor Councillor on the Sydney City Council, He also served a brief time as Acting Lord Mayor in Aug-Sep 1983 in the absence of Lord Mayor Doug Sutherland and Deputy Lord Mayor Tony Bradford.

After failing to gain victory as ALP candidate for the 1981 Wentworth by-election (which was won by the Liberals' candidate Peter Coleman, former Leader of the NSW Opposition), Tickner was successful in entering the federal parliament at the 1984 Hughes by-election. Bob Hawke appointed Tickner, in 1990, the Minister for Aboriginal and Torres Strait Islander Affairs; and he retained this post throughout Paul Keating's government. 

Tickner's tenure in office was marred by the Hindmarsh Island bridge controversy.  Partly due to this affair, and partly due to the increasing unpopularity of the Keating administration as a whole, Tickner was resoundingly defeated in the 1996 election by Liberal challenger Danna Vale, suffering an 11-point swing against him.  He was one of eight ministers in the Keating government to lose their seats.

He is the former chief executive of the Australian Red Cross, having served in that role from 2005 to 2015. Robert continues to be actively involved in campaigns for change. He is the founding and current chair of the Justice Reform Initiative, Co-Chair of the EveryAGE Counts Steering Committee and ambassador for ICAN Australia.

He has been married and divorced twice.  His first wife Christine later married his friend Tom Uren.

Bibliography 
Tickner, Robert E. Taking a stand : land rights to reconciliation (2001) Allen & Unwin, N.S.W.  
Tickner, Robert. Ten Doors Down: The Story of an Extraordinary Adoption Reunion (2020) Scribe Publications,

Notes

1951 births
Living people
Australian Labor Party members of the Parliament of Australia
Members of the Australian House of Representatives for Hughes
Members of the Australian House of Representatives
Keating Government
20th-century Australian politicians
Officers of the Order of Australia
Australian adoptees